Srđa Popović, also spelled Srdja Popovic, may refer to:

 Srđa Popović (activist) (born 1973), Serbian activist of Otpor!
 Srđa Popović (lawyer) (1937–2013), Yugoslav and Serbian civil rights lawyer and activist